Aktham ibn Sayfi al-Tamimi (d.44 AH) was a notable pre-Islamic Arab orator, judge, sage and poet, mostly famous for his proverbs. He was also known as Qadi al-Arab (lit. Judge of the Arabs)

Little is known about his life with certainty. He was born in Najd to the Usayyid branch of the tribe of Banu Tamim and was one of the most influential men of his tribe. Aktham is regarded as one of the muʿammarūn; people known for their longevity. His death occurred on 44 AH.

References 

664 deaths
7th-century Arabs
Bedouin tribal chiefs
Banu Tamim